Eighteen springs New and Best collection is an album by Taiwanese pop singer Ruby Lin. It contains two soundtracks for a 2003 drama-romance TV series based on the novel of the same title() by Chinese author Eileen Chang. It was released on 1 April 2004.

Track listings

Awards and nominations
2004 East Wind Music Award
 Won : Best Theme Song From TV Series

External links
163.com Page 
QQ.com Official Page

References

2004 albums
Ruby Lin albums